The men's 50 metre freestyle S6 event at the 2012 Paralympic Games took place on 4 September at the London Aquatics Centre.

Three heats were held, heat one with five competitors, the rest of the heats with six competitors. The swimmers with the eight fastest times advanced to the final.

Heat

Heat 1

Heat 2

Heat 3

Final

Swimming at the 2012 Summer Paralympics